King Records was an American label founded in 1943 by Syd Nathan in Cincinnati, Ohio, United States. The label owned several divisions, including Federal Records, which launched the career of James Brown. It released original material until 1975.

History
Initially King specialized in country music, at the time known as hillbilly music. King advertised, "If it's a King, It's a Hillbilly – If it's a Hillbilly, it's a King." One of the label's hits was "I'm Using My Bible for a Road Map" by Reno and Smiley. Important recordings in this field were done by the Delmore Brothers and Wayne Raney. The Delmores and Moon Mullican played a country-boogie style that was similar to rockabilly. Several King artists, such as Bill Beach, are in the Rockabilly Hall of Fame.

Queen Records was the "Race Records" division of King Records and was also owned by Syd Nathan. It was founded in 1943 and was eventually folded into King.

King also owned Federal Records, which launched the career of James Brown. The label hired Ralph Bass and recorded R&B musicians such as Hank Ballard & The Midnighters, Roy Brown, Valerie Carr, Champion Jack Dupree, Ivory Joe Hunter, Joe Tex, Johnny "Guitar" Watson, and Otis Williams and the Charms. King had a long legal suit against James Brown after he repeatedly violated his contract with the company.
King bought De Luxe Records (in 1952) and Bethlehem Records (in 1962). In 1951, Federal Records made the crossover of an R&B record into the white pop music charts with Billy Ward and the Dominoes' "Sixty Minute Man" (Federal 12022). It reached number 17 on the Billboard pop chart and number 1 in the R&B chart.

King mixed the country and R&B sides of the label. Many of its country singers, such as Moon Mullican, the Delmore Brothers, Hawkshaw Hawkins, and Zeb Turner, covered the label's R&B songs, such as "Grandpa Stole My Baby", "Rocket to the Moon", "Bloodshot Eyes", and "I Got Loaded". R&B artists recorded country songs, such as Bubber Johnson's "Keep a Light in the Window for Me".

During the 1950s, King distributed portable phonographs. King Records was unique among the independent labels because the entire production process was done in-house: recording, mastering, printing, pressing and shipping. This gave Nathan complete control, and a record could be recorded one day and shipped to radio stations the next day in quantities as small as 50. For that reason, King records that did not sell well are now rare.

Seymour Stein, a co-founder of Sire Records, interned at King Records as a high school student in 1957 and 1958 and worked for King from 1961 to 1963.

When Nathan died in 1968, King was acquired by Hal Neely's Starday Records and restarted as Starday and King Records. The songwriting team of Jerry Leiber and Mike Stoller bought the label in 1970 but sold it soon afterwards to LIN Broadcasting, which in turn sold it to Tennessee Recording & Publishing (owned by Freddy Bienstock, Hal Neely, Leiber and Stoller), which sold it to Gusto Records in 1974. In 1971, James Brown's recording contract and back catalogue were sold to Polydor Records. Since 2001, Collectables Records has been reissuing the King Records catalogue.

The former King Records headquarters, at 1540 Brewster Avenue in Cincinnati, is still standing. A historical marker was placed by the Rock and Roll Hall of Fame in 2008. Now owned by the city of Cincinnati, it approved the formation of the King Records Legacy Committee which is working on revitalizing the historic site and explaining its history.

Discography

King 500 Series
The King 500 Series of 12 inch LPs were released between 1956 and 1959.

King 600 Series
The King 600 series was released between 1958 and 1960.

King 700 Series
The King 700 series was released between 1960 and 1962.

King 800 Series
The King 800 series was released between 1962 and 1964.

King 900 Series
The King 900 series was released between 1964 and 1966.

King 1000 Series
The King 1000 series was released between 1966 and 1970.

King 1100 Series
The King 1100 series was released between 1970 and 1973.

Labels associated with King records
Audio Lab Records (King's budget album label)
Bethlehem Records
De Luxe Records
Federal Records
Festival Records
Queen Records
Starday Records

See also
 List of record labels

References

External links

The King Records story
King Records on the Internet Archive's Great 78 Project
King Records original location in Cincinnati, OH

Record labels established in 1943
American country music record labels
Defunct record labels of the United States
Historic Rock and Roll Landmarks
Jazz record labels
Music of Cincinnati
Cincinnati Local Historic Landmarks
Record labels disestablished in 1974